Álvaro Meseguer Fallado (born 24 July 1992) is a Spanish footballer who plays for CD Tudelano as a central defender.

Football career
Meseguer was born in Alcañiz, Teruel, Aragon, and graduated from local Real Zaragoza's youth setup. He made his senior debuts with the reserves in the 2010–11 campaign in the Tercera División.

On 15 July 2014 Meseguer renewed his link with the club, after being captain in the previous season. On 14 March of the following year he played his first match as a professional, coming on as a late substitute for fellow youth graduate Diego Rico in a 0–0 home draw against CD Lugo in the Segunda División.

References

External links

1992 births
Living people
People from Alcañiz
Sportspeople from the Province of Teruel
Spanish footballers
Footballers from Aragon
Association football defenders
Segunda División players
Segunda División B players
Tercera División players
Real Zaragoza B players
Real Zaragoza players
CD Tudelano footballers